Avenger is a Star Trek novel by William Shatner (co-written with Judith and Garfield Reeves-Stevens), depicting the events shortly after the feature film Star Trek Generations and the previous "Shatnerverse" novel The Return. It is a direct sequel to the latter, and forms part of the "Shatnerverse" collection of novels, being the third novel written by Shatner for the Trek series of novels. It was published in 1997 by Pocket Books.

Plot summary
The Federation must contain a "virogen"  (plague) that is killing plant life, damaging animal young, and killing people on several vital systems that collectively supply food for the entire Federation. Avenger opens with the Federation trying to maintain a strict quarantine to contain the spread of the virogen as the Federation's reserves run low.  The Enterprise-E is assigned to a blockade of the Alta Vista system, home to the Gamrow Station, a research facility designed to house about 60 scientists which is temporarily being used as a refugee camp for 1400 people.   Captain Jean-Luc Picard and his crew attempt to stop a shuttlecraft, piloted by a Vulcan called Stron and a pregnant human woman, from fleeing the quarantined system, but the two appear to commit suicide by trying to jump into warp while caught in the Enterprise-E's tractor beam.  Picard, however, knowing that Vulcans believe suicide to be illogical, is unconvinced that the couple actually died in the warp core explosion.

Meanwhile, on the once-verdant planet of Chal (first referenced in The Ashes of Eden), a mysterious stranger walks through the desolation towards a Starfleet medical outpost.  He meets with the commanding officer, Christine McDonald, and requests the location of the burial place of a native woman named Teilani.  He discovers, with Christine's help, that Teilani is not dead, not yet, but will be soon with the virogen quickly working through her body.  He goes to her and prepares an unusual herbal tea with dried leaves and hot water. Commander McDonald and the outpost's doctor, Andrea M'Benga, look on in amazement as Teilani begins to miraculously recover.  The stranger reveals to M'Benga that the leaves are Trannin leaves, native to the Klingon home planet.  Christine determines to send a message to Starfleet, announcing that a way to combat the virogen has been found. Christine's suspicions of the stranger's identity are aroused when Teilani calls the stranger "James."  Her suspicions are further confirmed when she finds a plaque that the stranger had used as a tray for the tea, emblazoned with the name and number of the starship Enterprise from eighty years in the past.  Christine confronts the stranger with her belief that he is actually James T. Kirk, which he does not deny, insisting that she only refer to him as "Jim," and that she reveal his real identity to no one. It is later revealed Kirk was saved by a fortuitous last-minute Borg transporter beam-out. Flung to another galaxy entirely, he materializes on a planet which is used as a dumping ground for the detritus of failed Borg missions. At the verge of death, on a planet near a galactic core, Kirk is discovered by beings who were able to release themselves from Borg assimilation. His body is purged of the Borg nanites which had been killing him, and after two years of working, living, and learning from, and with, the survivors, he discovers a Borg scout ship which he uses to return to the planet Chal.

Captain Picard dispatches a search party to an asteroid which was nearby to the explosion of the Vulcan shuttle to determine whether Stron and his wife really died there.  Commander Data confirms that there are no traces of organic particles in the area, thus proving that Stron and his mate somehow escaped the shuttle prior to its detonation.  However, the manner of their escape remains a mystery.  Picard reports his findings personally to the commander of the Gamrow Station, Chiton Kincaid, by beaming down alone to speak with her.  He realizes with horror as their conversation goes on that she was already, in fact, aware that Stron and the woman did not die in the explosion.  Before he can react, she attacks him with a disruptor and he blacks out.

Back on Chal, Teilani is almost fully recovered, but still weak.  Kirk cares for her faithfully, and is in the process of building a home.  However, their peaceful life is jarringly interrupted when a wing of Orion pirates begin mercilessly attacking the medical base.  Jim begins running towards the base, only to be beamed up to Commander McDonald's ship, the U.S.S. Tobias.  Christine insists that Kirk momentarily assume command and take out the Orion fighters.  Reluctantly, Jim agrees on the condition that Teilani be beamed up immediately.  Once he knows she is safe, he takes a course of action by bringing the Tobias into the planet's atmosphere and successfully outmaneuvering the pirate ships.  To Christine's dismay, he insists on destroying all of the pirates, rather than letting the survivors flee.  Jim explains that Orions are mercenaries, with no reason to attack Chal if there's no money in it; someone must have intercepted Christine's message to Starfleet about the Trannin leaves, and sent the Orions to ravage the base.  Kirk's suspicions are aroused: there's no way in his mind that the rapid spread of the virogen is an accident.

It is soon discovered that the virogen outbreak was created intentionally by the Symmetrists, a group of eco-terrorists who have links to Captain James T. Kirk's past. The resurrected Kirk, along with Captain Jean-Luc Picard, and their respective crews, must unite to uncover the conspiracy that caused this before it undermines the Federation.

Ambassador Spock, concurrently, is on a deeply personal mission of his own. He is personally bound to find the murderer of his father Sarek, believing that a conscious decision, not a disease, sealed his father's fate. He and Kirk reunite to avenge Sarek's death. During this time, Spock, though not entirely of his own volition, occasionally releases all his emotional self-control. This lack of control, uncharacteristic for a Vulcan, is a signature trait of Bendii disease, the same affliction which (supposedly) killed his father. Kirk and Spock discover that the people who assassinated Sarek are now after Spock, having infected him with a disease very similar to Bendii. It is revealed that a personal aide to both Sarek and Spock killed Sarek by using a poison whose effects were nearly identical to those of Bendii syndrome. In the end, it is Kirk, accompanied by Spock, who avenges Sarek's death. After, Kirk returns to Teilani and Spock is given treatment to expunge the poison from his body.

External links

Novels based on Star Trek: The Original Series
Novels based on Star Trek: The Next Generation
Novels by William Shatner
1998 Canadian novels
Novels by Judith and Garfield Reeves-Stevens
Pocket Books books
Novels set in the 23rd century